Roberrt is a 2021 Indian Kannada-language action thriller film written and directed by Tharun Sudhir and produced by Umapathy Srinivasa Gowda under the banner of Umapathy Films. The film stars Darshan, Vinod Prabhakar, Jagapathi Babu, Ravi Kishan, debutante Asha Bhat, Devaraj and P. Ravi Shankar. 

Arjun Janya composed the soundtrack and background score was by V. Harikrishna. Cinematography and editing are performed by Sudhakar S. Raj and K. M. Prakash respectively. The film was theatrically released on 11 March 2021 and received mixed reviews from critics but went on to become the highest-grossing Kannada film of 2021  and one of the highest-grossing Kannada film.

Plot
Raghava lives in Lucknow with his son Arjun and is the head cook in a Brahmin caterer where he helps his caterer's daughter Amrutha in a catering job, who soon falls for him for his honesty. Meanwhile, Balaram Tripathi, an ex-minister vows vengeance on Raghava: Balaram had planned an assassination attempt on ministerial candidate Omkar Shukla after he was humiliated in a wrestling betting, but was saved by Raghava. Tripathi had arranged his son Kishan's marriage with the Central minister's daughter for political gain but was ruined by Raghava and Arjun. 

Tripathi kidnaps Raghava and tells his henchman to finish him off and Arjun (who was asleep in his home), who is held at gunpoint, but Raghava violently finishes all of them and Tripathi. Kishan seeks the help of crime boss, Sarkar, to kill Raghava and dispatches men to finish him. Raghava kills them without anyone's knowledge, where Sarkar is astonished to see Raghava and reveals that Raghava is Roberrt and Arjun is not his son. When confronted by Amrutha to reveal his past. 

Past: Roberrt and Raghava are friends/brothers, who works for Sarkar's elder brother Nanabhai in Mangalore. Sarkar and Nanabhai were separated from each other due to jealousy. Later, Roberrt helps Raghava and Thanu express their love for each other to their parents, who declines, but later accepts their relationship. They get married and also bear a son named Arjun. Meanwhile, Roberrt and Raghava discovers Nana's son Cherry indulging in human trafficking and they kill him despite Nana's requests. While celebrating Arjun's birthday, Nana's gang are attacked by unknown forces and Thanu gets killed in the crossfire. 

Depressed about Thanu's death and worried about Arjun's future, Raghava becomes approver to the cops by divulging Nana's crimes to police commissioner Sathyadev. Raghava finds that Nana has planned to kill him in an encounter and arrives at Roberrt's den where he believes Roberrt to be involved in Nana's plan, the two indulge in a fight. However, Nana arrives along with Sarkar and shoots Raghava and knocks Roberrt. Nana and Sarkar reveals that it was all their plan and also divulges that Nana is the main mastermind behind the human traffickling and Cherry was following his orders.

Nana kills Thanu's parents and throws a dead Raghava, Roberrt and an infant Arjun into a ship container where they drown it in the sea. Roberrt and Arjun survive and escapes from the drowned container. Before dying, Roberrt promises Raghava that he will raise Arjun in a non-violent manner.

Present: Roberrt/Raghava requests Amrutha to keep his past as a secret from Arjun. Meanwhile, Nana and Sarkar arrive in Lucknow where he traps Amrutha's father Vishwanath Bhat in a food poisoning case and also frames Roberrt/Raghava in Tripathi's murder case. He calls Roberrt/Raghava and divulges that they kidnapped Arjun and tells him to finish the matter once and for all. Roberrt/Raghava arrives and finishes Nana, Kishan, and Sarkar without Arjun's knowledge where they have killed in Ram Navami event.

Cast

Production
Production of the film began with the working title D53. Producers of Hebbuli and Ondalla Eradalla, Umapathy Films, announced that they would collaborate with Darshan under the direction of Tharun Kishore Sudhir, in whose debut movie Chowka (2017), Darshan had made a special appearance as Robert. Principal photography began in June 2019. The first theme poster was released by the production house on 6 November 2018, while the title of the movie was announced as "Roberrt" on 25 December 2018 on Christmas. The second theme poster of the movie was released on 5 June 2019 on the eve of Ramzan festival.

Coinciding with the announcement of the title, a theme poster was also released on 25 December 2018. The poster saw Darshan as the incarnation of Hanuman with Rama on his shoulder. Mehreen Pirzada was initially selected as the heroine of the movie but opted out due to dates issue. The shooting of the movie had been undergoing confidentially with mobile phones reportedly banned at the shoot locations. Director Tharun Sudhir had revealed that Darshan would be portraying  in the movie.

Soundtrack

The film's songs are composed by Arjun Janya. This marks the fourth collaboration of Janya and Darshan after Chakravarthy, Tarak and Odeya. The rerecording of the movie is by V. Harikrishna.

Kannada

Roberrt's first song, "Ba Ba Ba Na Ready," was released on 3 March 2020.
The makers released "Jai Sri Ram" from the movie. The song has two versions, out of which one version has been sung by Shankar Mahadevan, and another was sung by Chorus ft. Divya Kumar.
The third song, "Dostha Kano," was released on 21 March 2020.
"Kannu Hodiyaka" was released on 20 February 2021.
"Baby Dance Floor Ready" was released on 28 February 2021.

Telugu

Release
Roberrt was released on 11 March 2021 along with Telugu dubbed version by the same name,  on an eve of Maha Shivaratri in 1200 theatres worldwide. It was originally scheduled for a release in April 2020, The film was delayed for several months due to the COVID-19 pandemic in India. The film was released on about 1600 screens, including 650 in Karnataka and about 350 in Telangana and Andhra Pradesh, 300 in rest of India and 300 in overseas. It was also dubbed in Hindi under the same title by RKD Studios.

Home media
The digital rights of the film was bagged by Amazon Prime Video. It was released for streaming on Amazon Prime Video on April 25, in five languages - Kannada, Telugu, Tamil, Malayalam and Hindi. The satellite rights of the Kannada and Hindi versions of the film, were taken by Udaya TV and Colors Cineplex. For the first time ever, the Kannada version was telecasted on November 4, at 6:30 P.M.

Reception

Critical reception 
Sunayana Suresh, in her review for The Times of India rated 4/5 and stated, "Darshan and Tharun Kishore Sudhir teaming up for the first time together for a full fledged film. The film, which releases almost a year after its original release date, manages to live up to that and ends up being more than just a mass action entertainer and has enough to cater to the family audience too."

Y Maheswara Reddy of Bangalore Mirror rated 4/5 and stated, "Roberrt bilingual (Kannada and Telugu) movie has all the ingredients required to entertain mass audiences, especially the hard-core fans of Challenging Star Darshan. Though this movie was scheduled to be released in April 2020, it got postponed due to the pandemic. However, it has succeeded in meeting the expectation of movie buffs." A Sharadhaa of The New Indian Express rated 4/5 and stated, "Darshan-starrer 'Roberrt' is anything but a typical action fare from the Challenging Star. The actor, who is known for his mass appeal, also delivers an all-round performance that establishes his class credentials too."

Box office
Roberrt on the first day of its release collected 17.24 crore in Karnataka. The film collected 3.12 crore in Telangana and Andhra Pradesh on its first day . However, it was reported that the makers were spreading inflated box office collections. The movie was reported to have collected Rs. 78.36 crore in 8 days. It completed 25 days at theatres until they were shut due to the second wave of COVID-19.

Awards

Notes

References

External links
 

Film spin-offs
Films postponed due to the COVID-19 pandemic
Indian action thriller films
2020s Kannada-language films
2020s masala films
Films shot in Karnataka
Films shot in Varanasi
Indian action drama films
Films set in Lucknow
Films shot in Lucknow